EGFR may refer to:
 Epidermal growth factor receptor (EGFR), a transmembrane receptor protein in humans
 Estimated glomerular filtration rate (eGFR), a measure of renal function